"Dancing to the Same Song" is the third single from Australian recording artist Elen Levon. It was released digitally on 31 August 2012. A digital remix extended play was released on 21 September 2012. The accompanying music video premiered on YouTube on 15 October 2012. "Dancing to the Same Song" peaked at number 73 on the ARIA Singles Chart and number 14 on the ARIA Dance Singles Chart.

Track listing
Digital download
"Dancing to the Same Song" – 3:52

Digital Remix EP
"Dancing to the Same Song" (Radio Edit) – 3:52
"Dancing to the Same Song" (Oskar Remix) – 6:32 
"Dancing to the Same Song" (Jaxxon Remix) – 6:55
"Dancing to the Same Song" (G-Wizard & Joey Kax Remix) – 4:56

Credits
Writers- Mark Maxwell, Sean Foreman, Nathaniel Motte, Elen Levon
Producers- Mark Maxwell, Nathaniel Motte

Charts
During its week of release, "Dancing to the Same Song" was the sixth most added song to Australian radio and was the seventh most added song the following week.

References

2012 singles
2012 songs
Elen Levon songs
Songs written by Nathaniel Motte
Songs written by Mark Maxwell (producer)
Songs written by Sean Foreman